Green Village is an unincorporated community in Franklin County, in the U.S. state of Pennsylvania.

History
Greenvillage was platted in 1793, and named after Greene Township. Variant names were "Greene Village" and "Greenvillage". A post office called Green Village was established in 1813, and remained in operation until 1915.

References

Unincorporated communities in Franklin County, Pennsylvania
Unincorporated communities in Pennsylvania